Você passa eu acho graça is the second release by Clara Nunes. Released in 1968, it is noted for being her first foray into samba.

Track listing
 "Você não é como as flores"
 "Sabiá "
 "Cheguei à conclusão"
 "Desencontro"
 "Pra esquecer"
 "Rua D'Aurora"
 "Você passa e eu acho graça"
 "Sucedeu assim"
 "Grande amor"
 "Que é que eu faço"
 "Minha partida"
 "Corpo e alma"
 "Encontro"
 "Porta aberta "
 "A noite (Quando cai a noite)"

References

1968 albums
Clara Nunes albums
Portuguese-language albums
Odeon Records albums